Antianthe expansa, known generally as the keeled tree hopper or solanaceous treehopper, is a species of treehopper in the family Membracidae.

Subspecies
These two subspecies belong to the species Antianthe expansa:
 Antianthe expansa expansa
 Antianthe expansa humilis Fowler

References

External links

 

Smiliinae
Articles created by Qbugbot
Insects described in 1835